Göran Ehrnrooth  (1 April 1905 Helsinki – 9 January 1996 Helsinki) was a Finnish banker in Union Bank (Pohjoismaiden Yhdyspankki, later after several mergers Nordea. Göran Ehrnrooth worked for the Union Bank since 1933. He launched Mandatum. His successor was Mika Tiivola.

Industry 
The family business included the paper and board factory Kaukas and oil business Petko, that was later sold to British Petroleum. Investments e.g. in the paper factory Ahlström Oy, Hyvilla and Tampella.

Family 
Göran Ehrnrooth was married to Louise von Julin, daughter of Elsa Lovisa Standertskjöld and Jacob von Julin (1906–1987), the CEO of Kaukas paper factory.
Their children are Casimir Ehrnrooth (b. 1931) CEO UPM-Kymmene, Göran J. Ehrnrooth (b. 1934)  CEO Fiskars, Robert Ehrnrooth (b. 1939) CEO EFFOA-Suomen Höyrylaiva (Silja Line) and Elsa Margaretha Louise Fromond (b. 1942).

He belonged to the Ehrnrooth nobel family.

References

1905 births
1996 deaths
Businesspeople from Helsinki
People from Uusimaa Province (Grand Duchy of Finland)
Swedish-speaking Finns
Finnish bankers
20th-century Finnish businesspeople
Goran